Aarniokoski is a surname. Notable people with the surname include:

Doug Aarniokoski (born 1965), American television director and producer
Paavo Aarniokoski (1893–1961), Finnish farmer and politician

Finnish-language surnames